The 1999 Nigerian Senate election in Niger State was held on February 20, 1999, to elect members of the Nigerian Senate to represent Niger State. Ibrahim Kuta representing Niger East, Isa Mohammed Bagudu representing Niger South and Nuhu Aliyu Labbo representing Niger North all won on the platform of the Peoples Democratic Party.

Overview

Summary

Results

Niger East 
The election was won by Ibrahim Kuta of the Peoples Democratic Party.

Niger South 
The election was won by Isa Mohammed Bagudu of the Peoples Democratic Party.

Niger North 
The election was won by Nuhu Aliyu Labbo of the Peoples Democratic Party.

References 

February 1999 events in Nigeria
Nig
Niger State Senate elections